Events in the year 2017 in Kenya.

Incumbents
President: Uhuru Kenyatta
Deputy President: William Ruto
Chief Justice: David Maraga

Events
27 January – Battle of Kulbiyow
8 August – Kenyan general election, 2017
1 September – the Supreme Court nullified Kenyatta's election victory and ordered that a new presidential election take place within 60 days

Deaths
8 January – Colin Cameron Davies, Roman Catholic bishop (b. 1924).

References

 
2010s in Kenya
Years of the 21st century in Kenya
Kenya
Kenya